The 1993–94 Kategoria e Dytë was the 47th season of a second-tier association football league in Albania.

Second Division-1

Group A

Group B

Final

Second Division-2

Burrel Group

Vëllazërimi won the group and qualified to the promotion playoff

Elbasan Group

Shkumbini won the group and qualified to the promotion playoff

Sarandë Group

Bistrica won the group and qualified to the promotion playoff

Tiranë Group

Erzeni won the group and qualified to the promotion playoff

Source:

Promotion/relegation playoff

First round 

 Sopoti and Lushnja were relegated to 1994–95 Kategoria e Dytë.

Second round 

 Tomori and Shkumbini were promoted to 1994–95 National Championship.

Note 
 Akademia Ushtarake Tokësore “Skënderbeu”, Amaro Divas Romët, Bistrica, Dajti, Erzeni, Gramshi, Martaneshi, Piramida, Poliçani, Romët, Skrapari, Studenti, Tërbuni, Valbona, Vau i Dejës, Veleçiku, Vëllazërimi and Vora were relegated because were failed to secure a proper ground for next season.

References

 Giovanni Armillotta
 Calcio Mondiale Web

Kategoria e Parë seasons
2
Alba